Huairen is a county-level city in the north of Shanxi province, China. It is under the administration of Shuozhou city.

Climate

References

www.xzqh.org 

County-level divisions of Shanxi
Shuozhou